Otto Bohl (8 May 1885 – 24 October 1969) was the mayor of Augsburg, Germany, between January 1930 and May 1933. He was a member of the Bavarian People's Party. He studied legal science in Heidelberg and Munich. From 1948 till 1958 he was the Landrat of district Illertissen.

References

1885 births
1969 deaths
Mayors of Augsburg
Bavarian People's Party politicians